Acıpyam (formerly: Dadiş) is a village in Elazığ District. Elazığ Province, Turkey. Its population is 242 (2021). The village is populated by Turks.

References

Villages in Elazığ District